Dakhlet Nouadhibou Region (Wilayat Dakhlet Nouadhibou, "Interior Nouadhibou Region") is an administrative division of Mauritania. Its regional capital is Nouadhibou, which is located at its northwestern end and is home to nearly 95% of the region's population. The rest of the shoreline is sparsely populated with villages, but the east of the region is mostly uninhabited.

Demographics

As of 2013, the population of the region was 123,779, compared to 97,875 in 2011. There were 57.05 percent females and 42.95 percent males. As of 2008, the couples with children was 35.60 and couples without children was 3.70. The proportion with extended family was 37.90 percent and extended single-parent was 8.60 per cent, one-person was 6.50 percent, and single-parent nuclear was 7.80 percent. As of 2008, the rate of household confirming the existence of public telephone in their neighbourhood or village was 95.69, rate of households benefiting from electricity post in their neighbourhood was 12.63 percent, rate of households benefiting from health centre or health post in their neighbourhood was 2.53 percent, and rate of households benefiting from sanitary services was 21.90 percent.

Economy
As of 2008, the activity rate was 60.80 and economic dependency ratio was 0.59. The fraction of people working in government was 9.70 per cent, individual / household private was 18.20 per cent, other was 31.40 per cent, para public was 16.10 per cent, and private enterprise was 24.70 per cent. The unemployment rate as of 2008 was 37.80. As of 2013, the coverage rate of DPT3 children From 0 to 11 months in the region was 89.90 per cent, BGC vaccination was 80.10 and polio vaccination coverage was 87.80. As of 2007, the number of tourist establishments in the region was 19. As of 2008, the literacy rate for people aged 15 years and over was 73.50. The net enrolment ratio of girls for secondary level was 35.90 per cent, net enrolment ratio of boys for secondary level was 26.10 per cent, and total net enrolment ratio at secondary level was 31.60 per cent.

Geography
The region is named after the Dakhlet Nouadhibou Bay and contains Mauritania's part of the Cabo Blanco peninsula. It is the westernmost region of the country. It borders Western Sahara to the north, the Mauritanian region of Inchiri to the east and the Atlantic Ocean to the west. The Bay of Arguin dominates the west of the region, the Banc d'Arguin National Park dominates the south and includes much of the bay's islands, the southernmost of the bay and the southeasternmost parts of the park are not in the region, about a third of the region is a national park area. Nearly all of the country's islands and islets lies in this region and they include Echakcher, Kiaones, Niroumi, Nair, Arel, Tidra, the country's largest island, Kijji, Touffat, Cheddid and sometimes Serenni.
Mauritania is mostly covered with desert, with only its western regions around the coast of Atlantic Ocean having some vegetation, along with the southern regions on the Senegal river. There are some oasis in the desert regions. Since it is a desert, there are large shifting dunes forming temporary ranges. Due to the geography, the inhabitants historically, have been nomadic. In modern times, people have migrated to urban centres during the drought in 1970 and 1980. There are a few sedentary cultivators, who are located only in the Southern regions of the country.

Local administration

The local administration is adopted from French local administration framework with the Ministry of Internal Control governing the local bodies. The original administration was held by Governors of each district, but after the municipal elections in 1994, the powers have been decentralized from the district bodies.

Nouadhibou is one of 15 wilayas (regions). The smallest administrative division in the region is the commune. A group of communes form a moughataa (department) and a group of moughataa form a district. The executive power of the district is vested on a district chief, while it is on the hakem in the moughataa.  The communes are responsible for overseeing and coordinating development activities and are financed by the state. The Local Governments have their own legal jurisdiction, financial autonomy, an annual budget, staff, and an office. The elections for the local government are conducted every five years along with Senate and Parliamentary elections. On account of the political instability, the last elections were held in 2006. Settlements outside the capital includes Agadir or Arguin, Arkeiss, R'Geiba, Iouik (or Iwik), Tanoudert, Teichott, Ten-Alloul and Tessot.

See also
Regions of Mauritania
Departments of Mauritania

References

 
Regions of Mauritania